Barnes Ridge is a ridge in New Madrid County in the U.S. state of Missouri.

Barnes Ridge has the name of the local Barnes family of pioneers.

References

Landforms of New Madrid County, Missouri
Ridges of Missouri